Stuart Kelly (born 1 August 1981) is a Scottish footballer. He started his professional career at Rangers F.C. in 1998. A central midfielder, Kelly has played for top division clubs in New Zealand, Australia and Thailand.

During his career at Auckland City FC they won the Oceania Champions League 2010/11, qualifying for the FIFA World Club Cup in Japan 2011.

Football career

Glasgow Rangers
Kelly started his career with Rangers Youth. During his early career he was also a youth player with Heart of Midlothian, Blackburn Rovers and Manchester United.

At 14 he made his debut for the Rangers youth team and made his reserve team debut aged 16.
In 1996, aged 15 he rejected to sign for Heart of Midlothian, Blackburn Rovers, Manchester United, French club RC Strasbourg and signed with Rangers.

Shettleston FC
In August 2001 Kelly's contract was not renewed at Rangers.
Contracts at Hibernian, St Mirren and Los Angeles Galaxy (work permit), were not successful and eventually signed a one-year contract to play non-league football at Shettleston before the summer transfer window closed in August 2001, where he played alongside former Celtic and Republic of Ireland international Tommy Coyne.
Kellys goals helped Shettleston win the league and cup double.

East Stirlingshire FC
Kelly joined East Stirlingshire after 1 year at Shettleston on a free transfer, as agreed in his contract.
Despite East Stirlingshire's poor performances, Kelly scored goals consistently in what was the clubs poorest run of form in their club history.
At the end of the 2004 season Kelly had interest from several clubs but signed for 2 years with Canterbury United in New Zealand.

Canterbury United
Kelly played from 2004 to 2007 for Canterbury United.
The New Zealand Knights in 2004 asked Kelly to test and despite an impressive showing he was injured for 4 months and was not offered a contract.
In the 2005/06 season Canterbury reached the New Zealand Football Championship grand final, with Kelly scoring two goals in the 90 minutes against Auckland City FC. The game finished 3–3 after extra time and, despite Kelly scoring a penalty, Canterbury were defeated in a sudden death shoot out.

The game was broadcast on Sky Sports in Australia and brought interest from A-League club Newcastle Jets and Oakleigh Cannons.

Kelly was also Canterbury United captain for the 2007/08 season before departing for Australia.

Oakleigh Cannons and South Melbourne FC
In 2008 Kelly signed for Australian Club Oakleigh Cannons, playing under former Glasgow Rangers and Scotland player Stuart Munro.
Inside conflict at the club led to Kelly's departure and he signed with South Melbourne FC as a defensive midfielder. His time at South Melbourne FC was cut short when he suffered a broken leg during a freak training ground collision.

Australian A-League clubs were monitoring his good performances but he returned to New Zealand for rehabilitation.

Otago United
In September 2008 Kelly returned to the New Zealand Football Championship signing 1-year with Otago United with former international Terry Phelan as his coach.
Otago United narrowly missed out on the play-offs in season 2009/10.

During season 2010 Kelly saw a move to the Israeli Premier League with Maccabi Ahi Nazareth F.C.,collapse with him then rejecting terms with Israeli First Division club Hapoel Marmorek F.C.

Auckland City FC
Kelly returned to New Zealand, signing for 1 season with Auckland City FC in September 2010.
Auckland City FC won the Oceania Champions League 2011 and were closely beaten in the 2010/11 New Zealand Football Championship grand final going down 3–2 to Waitakere United to an injury time winning goal.

Kelly was a main stay in the Auckland City FC starting eleven but was unable to be part of Auckland City FC's FIFA World Club Cup appearance in December 2011 with the Thailand Premier League season being extended to February 2012.

Khonkaen FC
In January 2011 Kelly signed a pre contract agreement with Thai Premier League club Khonkaen F.C., on a 2-year contract running from April 2011 and ending April 2013.
Former England assistant coach John Gorman and his son Nick assisted the move. Kelly made his début against BEC Tero just five days after winning the 2010–11 OFC Champions League with Auckland City FC.

Ayeyawady United F.C. of the Myanmar Premier League and playing AFC Cup 2012 spoke to Kelly in March 2012 to sign him for only the AFC Cup, but thought he was an Asian visa player.

OPS and PK-37
Kelly played three league games on trial with Oulun Palloseura in Finland, before signing for PK-37 one division below until the end of August. Kelly's contract was extended to the end of the season, but he did not re-sign for the 2013 season.

In January 2013, Kelly signed for Nakhon Pathom United but left when the head coach was sacked prior to the start of the season.
A brief trial with Thai Premier League club Army United ended with the club needing an Asian visa player instead. Kelly did not sign for another club after the passing of both parents in March. Having missed the transfer windows in Asia, he returned to New Zealand.

New Zealand
Kelly signed for Cashmere Technical for the New Zealand winter season, playing his part in the club winning the Mainland Premier League and the New Zealand FA Chatham Cup 2013, scoring in the final and repeating winning the Chatham Cup in 2014 with Cashmere Technical, with Kelly awarded the Jack Batty memorial trophy for the games most valuable player

In October 2013 Kelly signed for Canterbury United for the 2013/14 New Zealand ASB Premiership

Kelly represented Puaikura FC of the Cook Islands in the Oceania Champions League 2014/15 preliminary tournament, scoring 2 goals before returning to Canterbury United for the 2014/15 ASB Premiership.
Kelly signed with Southern United for the 2015/2016 ASB Premiership

In 2020 Kelly coached Halswell United back to the Mainland Premier League after an unbeaten season in the Canterbury Championship League.

International career
Kelly represented Scotland at U16–U20 level, making his debut against Northern Ireland in Belfast in 1996.

He was part of the Scotland squad for the 1998 UEFA European Under-16 Football Championship held in Scotland in 1998.

Following a 1–1 draw with holders Spain, 0–0 against the eventual winners the Republic of Ireland and a 2–0 defeat to Finland, Scotland were eliminated from the tournament.

Kelly also played in qualifying rounds for the 2000 World Cup and friendly games.

References

External links
 Stuart Kelly Auckland City FC Profile
 NZFC The Big Interview-Stuart Kelly
 Thailand Interview – Chonburi FC
 NZFC 2005/06 Grand Final
 Transfer OPS to PK-37
 Bangkok Post Interview
 Cashmere Technical win Chatham Cup

1981 births
Living people
Footballers from Glasgow
Scottish footballers
Association football midfielders
Rangers F.C. players
Glasgow United F.C. players
East Stirlingshire F.C. players
Canterbury United players
South Melbourne FC players
Southern United FC players
Auckland City FC players
Oulun Palloseura players
Puaikura FC players
Pallo-Kerho 37 players
Scottish Football League players
Victorian Premier League players
New Zealand Football Championship players
Ykkönen players
Kakkonen players
Scotland youth international footballers
Scottish expatriate footballers
Scottish expatriate sportspeople in New Zealand
Scottish expatriate sportspeople in Australia
Scottish expatriate sportspeople in Thailand
Scottish expatriate sportspeople in Finland
Expatriate association footballers in New Zealand
Expatriate soccer players in Australia
Expatriate footballers in Thailand
Expatriate footballers in Finland
Expatriate footballers in the Cook Islands